ADV. Abdul Majeed Bhat Laram popularly Known as Majeed Larmi  is an Indian politician, social worker and businessman from the union territory of Jammu and Kashmir who is one of state's most prominent politician.

Currently he is an M.L.A (Member of Legislative Assembly) from the Homshalibug Constituency of Anantnag, India.

Personal life
Abdul Majeed Bhat Was born on 10 March 1967 in Larm village in South Kashmir's Anantnag district. He completed his bachelor's from Degree college Boys Khanabal Anantnag and went for studying law at Kashmir University. In 2014 he went on to win the Homshalibug seat representing the National conference against Abdul Gaffar Sofi representing PDP.

References

External links
 Official website of honorable MLC Homshalibug Anantnag Kashmir
 Abdul Majeed Bhat on Facebook

1960 births
Living people
Indian people of Kashmiri descent
India MPs 1999–2004
India MPs 2004–2009
Kashmiri people
Abdullah political family
Members of the Jammu and Kashmir Legislative Council
People from Anantnag district
Jammu & Kashmir National Conference politicians